The Central Oklahoma Bronchos football program is a college football team that represents the University of Central Oklahoma. The team has had 13 head coaches since organized football began in 1902. The Bronchos have played in more than 1,000 games in its 110 seasons. In those seasons, three coaches have led the Bronchos to postseason bowl games: Al Blevins, Gary Howard and, Chuck Langston. Seven coaches have won conference championships with the Bronchos: Charles W. Wantland, Claude Reeds, Dale E. Hamilton, Gene Smith, Blevins, Phil Ball, and Howard. Blevins, and Howard have also won national championships with the Bronchos. Howard is the all-time leader in games coached, years coached, and wins, while Blevins is the all-time leader in winning percentage. Tracy Holland is, in terms of winning percentage, the least successful coach the Bronchos have had as he has a .341 winning percentage.

Of the 14 Bronchos coaches, Reeds is the only person who has been inducted into the College Football Hall of Fame, albeit from his time as a player for the Oklahoma Sooners. The current coach is Adam Dorrel.

Key

Coaches
Statistics correct as of the end of the 2022 NCAA Division II football season

Notes

References

Central Oklahoma

University of Central Oklahoma-related lists
Oklahoma sports-related lists